New Jazz may refer to:

Nu jazz, a subgenre of jazz music
Prestige Records, initially known as New Jazz. Later used for the name of a Prestige subsidiary label